Petrochimi Tabriz Football Club was an Iranian football club based in Tabriz, Azerbaijan Province. They were founded in 2001 and dissolved in 2010 because of lack of support and financial issues.

The football club is part of the Petroshimi Tabriz Club who have a particularly successful racing road bicycle racing team who are the current champions of Asia.

Season-by-season
The table below chronicles the achievements of Petrochimi Tabriz in various competitions since 2001.

Club managers
  Zoran Smileski (June 2008 – June 9)
  Reza Vatankhah (June 2009 – Oct 09)
  Zoran Smileski (Oct 2009–2010)

Players

See also
 Petroshimi Tabriz FSC
 Petrochimi Tabriz Cycling Team

References

External links
  Players and Results
  Tabriz Petrochemical Company (T.P.C.)

Fan sites
 Fan blog

Football clubs in Iran
Sport in Tabriz
Association football clubs established in 2001
2001 establishments in Iran
2010 disestablishments in Iran